Liechtenstein competed at the 2008 Summer Olympics, held in Beijing, People's Republic of China. The National Olympic Committee of Liechtenstein nominated two athletes for the games. Tennis player Stephanie Vogt was also nominated but had to withdraw because of an injury.

Athletics

Shooting

References
 https://sports.yahoo.com/olympics/beijing/athletes?country_codes=LIE

Nations at the 2008 Summer Olympics
2008
Summer Olympics